Vasily Gabashvili, also known by his Russified name Vasily Davidovich Gabayev (1853–1933) was a Georgian military commander in the service of the Russian Empire and the Democratic Republic of Georgia.

Of a noble family, Gabashvili served as an officer in the Imperial Russian army and took part in the 1877-78 war with the Ottoman Empire. He then fought in World War I and was promoted to lieutenant general in 1916. He served as a military commandant of Tiflis from 1916 until 1917 when he was appointed commander of the newly created Georgian Army Corps which provided a basis for a future national Georgian army. He retained a top military post during Georgia's short-lived independence (1918-1921), but retired after the Soviet takeover in 1921.

References 

1853 births
1933 deaths
Generals from Georgia (country)
Imperial Russian Army generals
Georgian lieutenant generals (Imperial Russia)
Recipients of the Order of St. Vladimir, 4th class
Recipients of the Order of St. Vladimir, 3rd class
Recipients of the Order of St. Anna, 1st class
Georgian generals in the Imperial Russian Army
People of World War I from Georgia (country)
Russian military personnel of World War I
Russian military personnel of the Russo-Turkish War (1877–1878)